The Pungcheon Im clan is a Korean clan based in Kwail County, South Hwanghae Province. According to the research held in 2015, the number of Pungcheon Im clan’s member was 143881. Their founder was  who was from Shaoxing, China and came to Goryeo.  worked as Chao Feng Dai Fu and General-in-Chief during Chungnyeol of Goryeo’s reign.

See also 
 Korean clan names of foreign origin

References

External links 
 

 
Korean clan names of Chinese origin
Im clans